Rajpura Thermal Power Plant is a coal-based thermal power plant located in Nalash village near Rajpura in Patiala district in the Indian state of Punjab. The power plant is operated by the Larsen & Toubro company.

Capacity

References

Coal-fired power stations in Punjab, India
Patiala district
Energy infrastructure completed in 2014
2014 establishments in Punjab, India